The 1948 All England Championships was a badminton tournament held at the Harringay Arena, London, England, from 3–6 March 1948.

Final results

Tonny Olsen married and changed her name to Tonny Ahm.

Men's singles

Women's singles

References

All England Open Badminton Championships
All England Badminton Championships
All England Open Badminton Championships in London
All England Championships
All England Badminton Championships
All England Badminton Championships